Katie Lynch (born 20 April 2000) is an Australian rules footballer playing for the Western Bulldogs in the AFL Women's competition (AFLW). She has previously played for the Collingwood Football Club.

Early life and state football
Lynch started with Australian rules football in the Auskick program at Canterbury, Melbourne. She then continued to junior level with the boys at Camberwell Sharks, playing 77 games with them until the under-14s level. During her year with under-11s, she was announced as the Yarra Junior Football League (YJFL) best and fairest and was selected for the V squad, a representative team of the YJFL. At the age of 15 joined the youth girls' team of Kew Rovers and played 34 games with them, winning Under 15 Girls Best and Fairest in 2015 and Youth Girls Best and Fairest in 2017. In 2016, she fractured her right ankle and didn't return to playing until halfway through 2017. In 2018 Lynch played for Oakleigh Chargers in the TAC Cup and represented Vic Metro in the AFL Women's Under 18 Championships, playing in both midfield and forward positions. During the 2018 season, Lynch was touted for an AFLW draft spot. While representing Vic Metro, she was selected for the initial squad of the 2018 AFL Women's Under 18 All-Australian team. Following this, Lynch also played two games with Collingwood VFL Women's (VFLW) team, with the first one being against NT Thunder at Collingwood's home ground Victoria Park. Lynch said that playing in the different competitions helped her adapt to different playing styles as each one is a different kind of game.

AFL Women's career

Collingwood
Lynch was drafted by Collingwood with the club's second selection and the 11th pick overall in the 2018 AFL Women's draft. The coach Wayne Siekman said that she's "a tall, big bodied midfielder who can also push forward. Katie uses her size to her advantage to win the ball and also push the opposition off. She has a very damaging left foot kick that rarely misses the target." Following her debut, Lynch didn't miss a game of the season, playing in all six of the remaining matches.

Western Bulldogs
In August 2020, Lynch was traded to the Western Bulldogs along with pick #45 in exchange for pick #33. As soon as Lynch came to the Bulldogs, she had an impact on the team. She played as a defender for the majority of the year, and in her very first game with the team, she broke her career disposals record. After a successful season, she won the team's Best Young Player Award alongside teammate Jess Fitzgerald. It was revealed that Lynch had signed a contract extension with the club on 16 June 2021, after playing every game possible for the club that season.

After an excellent season 7, in which she took the second-most marks across the AFLW and led the Bulldogs for intercept possessions and rebound 50s, Lynch was rewarded with both 22under22 and All-Australian honours.

Personal life
Lynch grew up as a Richmond fan, ironically barracking for them in a match against Collingwood a month before being drafted to Collingwood. She studied at Carey Baptist Grammar School and was part of their Australian rules football leadership group.

Statistics
Statistics are correct the end of the 2021 season.

|- style="background-color: #eaeaea"
! scope="row" style="text-align:center" | 2019
|style="text-align:center;"|
| 16 || 6 || 1 || 0 || 20 || 14 || 34 || 9 || 14 || 0.2 || 0.0 || 3.3 || 2.3 || 5.7 || 1.5 || 2.3
|- 
! scope="row" style="text-align:center" | 2020
|style="text-align:center;"|
| 16 || 1 || 0 || 0 || 2 || 3 || 5 || 1 || 1 || 0.0 || 0.0 || 2.0 || 3.0 || 5.0 || 1.0 || 1.0
|- style="background-color: #eaeaea"
! scope="row" style="text-align:center" | 2021
|style="text-align:center;"|
| 10 || 9 || 0 || 0 || 63 || 20 || 83 || 28 || 22 || 0.0 || 0.0 || 7.0 || 2.2 || 9.2 || 3.1 || 2.4
|- class="sortbottom"
! colspan=3| Career
! 16
! 1
! 0
! 86
! 37
! 123
! 38
! 37
! 0.1
! 0.0
! 5.4
! 2.3
! 7.7
! 2.4
! 2.3
|}

References

External links 

2000 births
Living people
Collingwood Football Club (AFLW) players
Australian rules footballers from Victoria (Australia)
Oakleigh Chargers players (NAB League Girls)
Western Bulldogs (AFLW) players